Sayed Nafees al-Hussaini (11 March 1933 – 5 February 2008) (Urdu: سید نفیس الحسینی) was a calligrapher, Islamic scholar, poet, and spiritual figure. He was also blessed with calligraphy at one of the doors of the Masjid Al Haram in Makkah.

Early life and education
Nafees Al-Husseini was born in 1933 in Sialkot. His real name was Anwar Hussain but he became known as Nafees Al-Husseini Shah in the Islamic world. He received his early education at a high school in Bhopalwala. In 1947, he came to Faisalabad and studied up to FA.

Career
Nafees al-Hussaini started his calligraphy career in 1948. He inherited the art of calligraphy from his father, Syed Muhammad Ashraf Ali, who was an expert in Naskh and had a reputation for expertise and calligraphy in the Holy Qur'an. In 1952 he set up his office in Lahore. He gained special place and expertise in Naskh and Nastaliq scripts, apart from this he also created works of art in Kufic, Thuluth, Ruqʿah script and Ijaza. Nafees Al-Husseini visited many countries and participated in the International Calligraphy Competition in Iran and Egypt as a judge. He also invented a script in Nastaliq called "Nafees Nastaliq".

He also served as Central Deputy Emir of Aalmi Majlis Tahaffuz Khatm-e-Nubuwwat.

Awards
 Pride of Performance (1985)
 Sitara-i-Imtiaz
 First prize in a calligraphy exhibition of the Pakistan National Council of the Arts in 1980.
 First prize in the All Pakistan exhibition of Quranic calligraphy in 1982 organized by the Pakistan Public Relations Society.

Death
He died in Lahore on February 5, 2008. Funeral prayers were offered at Badshahi Masjid Lahore in which more than one lakh people from all over the country participated. And according to his will, he was buried in the graveyard of Khanqah Syed Ahmed Shaheed.

References

1933 births
2008 deaths
People from Sialkot District
Pakistani calligraphers
Recipients of Sitara-i-Imtiaz
Recipients of the Pride of Performance
Pakistani Islamic religious leaders
Pakistani Sunni Muslim scholars of Islam
Muslim missionaries
Pakistani religious writers
Pakistani poets
Deputy Emirs of Aalmi Majlis Tahaffuz Khatm-e-Nubuwwat